Loredana Simioli (27 February 1974 – 26 June 2019) was an Italian actress, comedian and TV host.

Historic face of Canale 9, in particular in the TeleGaribaldi program, was considered one of the most characteristic actresses of the Neapolitan landscape.

Biography 
Born in Naples on February 27, 1974, she was the sister of Radio Marte speaker Gianni Simioli. 

She took her first steps towards acting in the early 90s: she achieved a certain notoriety in 1998 with the transmission TeleGaribaldi on the broadcaster Canale 9, where she played the historical character of Mariarca, which made her known to the public of the whole Campanian region. In the mid-2000s she left the television to start the cinematic journey; in this context, the role of Maria in the 2012 film Reality, awarded at the Cannes Film Festival, is worthy of mention. 

She died on June 26, 2019 at the age of 45, after two years of fighting cancer. In the last period of her life she dedicated herself to the knowledge and the fight of the tumor thanks to the project "Io non ho vergogna" (I have no shame), culminating with the recording of a video clip in the Antonio Cardarelli hospital in Naples.

Filmography 
 L'amore buio – 2009
 Gorbaciof – 2010
 Reality – 2012
 Si accettano miracoli – 2014
 Perez. – 2014
 Troppo napoletano – 2016
 Nato a Casal di Principe – 2017

References 

Italian television actresses
1974 births
2019 deaths
Deaths from cancer in Campania